The 1926 State of the Union Address was given by Calvin Coolidge, the 30th United States President, on Monday, December 6, 1926, to the United States House of Representatives, and the United States Senate. It was his fourth address to a joint session. He said,

Basic quotes
"The social well-being of our country requires our constant effort for the amelioration of race prejudice and the extension to all elements of equal opportunity and equal protection under the laws which are guaranteed by the Constitution. The Federal Government especially is charged with this obligation in behalf of the colored people of the Nation. Not only their remarkable progress, their devotion and their loyalty, but, our duty to ourselves under our claim that we are an enlightened people requires us to use all our power to protect them from the crime of lynching."  
We need ideals that can be followed in daily life, that can be translated into terms of the home. We can not expect to be relieved from toil, but we do expect to divest it of degrading conditions. Work is honorable; it is entitled to an honorable recompense. We must strive mightily, but having striven there is a defect in our political and social system if we are not in general rewarded with success. 
To relieve the land of the burdens that came from the war, to release to the individual more of the fruits of his own industry, to increase his earning capacity and decrease his hours of labor, to enlarge the circle of his vision through good roads and better transportation, to lace before him the opportunity for education both in science and in art, to leave him free to receive the inspiration of religion, all these are ideals which deliver him from the servitude of the body and exalt him to the service of the soul. Through this emancipation from the things that are material, we broaden our dominion over the things that are spiritual.

References

Presidency of Calvin Coolidge
Speeches by Calvin Coolidge
State of the Union addresses
69th United States Congress
State of the Union Address
State of the Union Address
State of the Union Address
State of the Union Address
December 1926 events